Nikita Sergeyevich Muromsky (born 25 June 1999) is a Russian football player who plays for FC Forte Taganrog.

Club career
He made his debut in the Russian Football National League for FC Dynamo Bryansk on 27 February 2021 in a game against FC Spartak-2 Moscow.

References

External links
 
 Profile by Russian Football National League

1999 births
Sportspeople from Yekaterinburg
Living people
Russian footballers
Association football midfielders
FC Ural Yekaterinburg players
FC Rotor Volgograd players
FC Dynamo Bryansk players
FC Volgar Astrakhan players
FC Volga Ulyanovsk players
Russian First League players
Russian Second League players